Ḥarrat al-Birk is an ancient lava field located along Saudi Arabia's Red Sea coastline.

See also

 'Asir Region
 List of volcanoes in Saudi Arabia
 Sarat Mountains
 'Asir Mountains
 Tihamah

References

Volcanic fields
Lava fields
'Asir Province